Ernst Julius Marx (often Ernst Marx; 28 November 1728 in Ballenstedt, Principality of Anhalt-Bernburg - 25 March 1799) was an important German organ builder in Berlin. He worked in the tradition of Joachim Wagner.

Life 
The father George Christoph Marx was a master carpenter in Ballenstedt. Ernst Marx had been employed in the workshop of Johann Peter Migendt in Berlin since 1753/55 at the latest. It is doubtful whether he lived to see Joachim Wagner, who died in 1749. Marx worked together with Migendt (in Companie) and married a sister of Migendt's wife, Maria Louisa Balke, in 1756.

After the death of Peter Migendt in 1767 he continued the workshop alone. Pupils included Johann Simon Buchholz, son-in-law Johann Friedrich Falckenhagen, and son Friedrich Emanuel Marx, who took over the workshop after his father's death in 1799.

Marx was the youngest of the organ builders who carried on the tradition of Joachim Wagner (even though he was not to have known him personally) and who passed it on to his pupils. He died in Berlin, Kingdom of Prussia at the age of 70.

List of works (selection) 
Marx built organs in the Margraviate of Brandenburg, some also in Pomerania and Mecklenburg, and carried out rebuilding and repairs. Organs that no longer exist or are only preserved in small parts are set in italics.

Other works

References

Further reading 
 Ernst Julius Marx. In Uwe Pape, Wolfram Hackel, Christhard Kirchner (ed.): Lexikon norddeutscher Orgelbauer. Volume 4. Berlin, Brandenburg und Umgebung. Pape Verlag, Berlin 2017. .
 Wolf Bergelt: Wagner-Geist im Orgelbau der Schüler. Vol. 2: Stettin – St. Nikolai. Freimut & Selbst, Berlin 2014, .
 Wolf Bergelt: Orgelreisen durch die Mark Brandenburg. Freimut & Selbst, Berlin 2005, . S. 146 (ähnlicher Text im Weblink)

External links 
 Ernst Julius Marx Institut für Orgelforschung
 Ernst Julius Marx Organindex, einzelne Orgeln (eingeschränkter Zugriff)

German pipe organ builders
1728 births
1799 deaths
People from Ballenstedt